"Section 44" refers to the New South Wales Rural Fires Act 1997, specifically section 44, Commissioner’s responsibility. Essentially it is used to describe when the Rural Fire Service Commissioner declares a localised  "State of Emergency" for a specific district suffering severe fire conditions that cannot be managed without drawing in extensive resources from other areas.

Once declared by the Commissioner the district has access to any and all fire-fighting personnel/equipment from across the State at no cost to the district or RFS, with the State Government footing the bill of all related Section 44 declared operations.

See also
 Remote Area Firefighting Team
 Bushfires in Australia
 Fire Rescue New South Wales
 Country Fire Service (South Australia)
 Country Fire Authority (Victoria)

External links
 Rural Fires Act 1997
 NSW Rural Fire Service Website
 NSW Rural Fire Service Association

New South Wales Rural Fire Service
New South Wales legislation
1997 in Australian law
1990s in New South Wales